The SpongeBob SquarePants Movie – Music from the Movie and More... is the soundtrack to the 2004 animated film The SpongeBob SquarePants Movie, and second soundtrack album focused on the animated series SpongeBob SquarePants. It was released on November 9, 2004 by Sire Records and Nick Records.

Background
The album is an example of the crew of SpongeBob SquarePants eclectic musical tastes. When The Flaming Lips member Wayne Coyne suggested a duet with Justin Timberlake, series creator Stephen Hillenburg responded with, "I don't want any of those sort of commercial weirdos on there. I don't like those commercial people. I like you guys, and Wilco and Ween." The Flaming Lips performed "SpongeBob & Patrick Confront the Psychic Wall of Energy" on Late Night with Conan O'Brien the night before the film's release on November 19, 2004. During the performance, Wayne Coyne was encased in a giant bubble (similar to zorbs). A music video for the song was filmed as well.

The song "Goofy Goober Rock" is a parody of "I Wanna Rock" by Twisted Sister.

Track listing

Personnel
All information is derived from the booklet enclosed with the album.
Production
 Stephen Hillenburg – Producer
 Karyn Rachtman – Producer
 Andrew Weiss – Producer (uncredited)
 Andy Paley – Producer, vocals, instrumentation
 Gina Shay – Co-producer
 Tom Whalley – Executive album producer for Sire/Warner Bros. Records
 Seymour Stein – Executive album producer for Sire/Warner Bros. Records
 Craig Aaronson – Executive album producer for Sire/Warner Bros. Records
 Sessing Music Services – Music clearance
 Eban Schletter – Music consultant
 Pat Kraus – Mastering
 Michael Hately – Mastering
 Andrew Scheps – Engineer
 Heavy Iron Studios - Developer for Sire/Warner Bros. Records

Chart positions

References

External links
 Official Nickelodeon film website

2004 soundtrack albums
Indie rock soundtracks
Alternative rock soundtracks
Pop punk compilation albums
Surf compilation albums
Hip hop soundtracks
Heavy metal soundtracks
Pop soundtracks
SpongeBob SquarePants (film series)
Sire Records soundtracks
Comedy film soundtracks
Adventure film soundtracks
SpongeBob SquarePants albums